Alcazarized is the second studio album by Swedish dance group Alcazar. It was released on 6 May 2003 in Sweden, in Europe on 2 August 2004 and in Japan on 20 October 2004, in separate editions, each with a slightly different track listing.

Track list

Charts

References

Alcazar (band) albums
2003 albums
2004 albums